The 2017 National Invitation Tournament was a single-elimination tournament of 32 NCAA Division I Teams that were not selected to participate in the 2017 NCAA tournament. The annual tournament was played on campus sites in the first three rounds (the host team being the team with the higher seeding), with the semifinals and championship game being held at Madison Square Garden in New York City. The tournament began on Tuesday, March 14 and ended on Thursday, March 30. The NIT Selection Show aired Sunday March 12 on ESPNU.

Experimental rules
In February 2017, the NCAA approved a number of experimental rule changes for use in this tournament:
 Team fouls were reset to zero at the end of every 10 minute segment of each half (officially at 9:59). Similar to women's college basketball, the game was split into quarters for purposes of team fouls, but without a period break.
 There were no "one-and-one" foul shots. Instead, starting with the fifth total foul in each 10-minute segment, non-shooting fouls by the defensive team resulted in two free throws, with the only exception being administrative technical fouls. This mirrored foul counting in NCAA women's basketball, which has been played in quarters since the 2015–16 season.
 In a feature unique in the college game, but similar to that used by the (W)NBA, overtime was considered a separate period for purposes of accrued team fouls. The team foul limit was three per overtime period, with all non-shooting team fouls thereafter by the defense resulting in two free throws. 
 The shot clock was reset to 20 seconds when the ball was inbounded in the frontcourt following a foul (similar to the (W)NBA and FIBA, where a shot clock is reset to 14 seconds on such).

Participants

Automatic qualifiers
The following 10 teams were guaranteed berths into the 2017 NIT field when they failed to receive an at-large NCAA bid by virtue of having won their respective conference's regular season championship and failing to win their conference tournaments.

At-large bids
The following 22 teams were also awarded NIT berths.

Bids by conference

Seeds

Schedule
The NIT began on Tuesday, March 14. The first three rounds were played at campus sites. The semifinals were held on Tuesday, March 28 and the championship on Thursday, March 30 at Madison Square Garden in New York City.

Bracket
 

^ Indiana Athletic Director Fred Glass declined to host a home game at Simon Skjodt Assembly Hall citing concern it would "devalue" the Hoosiers' home court.

† Game played at Texas Southern’s Health and Physical Education Arena due to renovations at Hofheinz Pavilion.

^ Game played at UCF due to prior scheduled event at the State Farm Center.

Media
ESPN, Inc. had exclusive television rights. Games were telecast on ESPN, ESPN2, ESPNU, or ESPN3. Westwood One had exclusive radio rights to the semifinals and the championship.

See also
 2017 Women's National Invitation Tournament

References

National Invitation
National Invitation Tournament
2010s in Manhattan
National Invitation Tournament
Basketball competitions in New York City
College sports in New York City
Madison Square Garden
National Invitation Tournament
National Invitation Tournament
Sports in Manhattan